The 2007 African U-17 Championship was a football competition organized by the Confederation of African Football (CAF). The tournament took place in Togo. For the first time, the top four teams qualified for the 2007 FIFA U-17 World Cup (because of his expansion from 16 teams to 24) instead of three, as it has been on previous tournaments.

Qualification

Qualified teams

  (host nation)

Group stage

Group A

Group B

Knock-out stage

Semifinals

Third place match

Final

Winners

External links
RSSSF.com: African U-17 Championship 2007
CAF.com

 
Africa U-17 Cup of Nations
Under-17 Championship, 2007
African Under-17 Championship, 2007
2007 in youth association football